Bhagabat Sahu was the first Member of Parliament from Balasore Parliamentary constituency in 1951. He was a Gandhian and was a freedom fighter from the Eastern part of Odisha.

References

Year of birth missing
1990 deaths
Indian independence activists from Odisha
India MPs 1952–1957
India MPs 1957–1962
Lok Sabha members from Odisha
People from Balasore district
Indian National Congress politicians from Odisha